Charlie Cosnier (born 7 January 1980) is a French snowboarder. He competed in the men's parallel giant slalom event at the 2002 Winter Olympics.

References

External links
 

1980 births
Living people
French male snowboarders
Olympic snowboarders of France
Snowboarders at the 2002 Winter Olympics
People from Sélestat
Sportspeople from Bas-Rhin
21st-century French people